Rocque is a surname. Notable people with the surname include:

John Rocque (c. 1709 – 1762), English surveyor and cartographer
Kelsey Rocque (born 1994), Canadian curler
Marcel Rocque (born 1971), Canadian curler
Michael Rocque (born 1899), Indian field hockey player

See also
Larocque, a surname
Rocques, a French commune